Hyades may refer to:

Hyades (band)
Hyades (mythology)
Hyades (star cluster), an open star cluster in the constellation Taurus

it:Iadi